Atelographus decoratus is a species of longhorn beetles of the subfamily Lamiinae. It was described by Monne and Monne in 2011, and is known from Brazil.

References

Beetles described in 2011
Endemic fauna of Brazil
Acanthocinini